Xu Wu (Chinese: 徐武; Pinyin: Xú Wǔ; born 14 February 1991) is a Chinese football player  who currently plays for Shaanxi Chang'an Athletic in the China League One.

Club career
Xu started his football career in 2011 when he was promoted to Beijing Guoan's first team squad. On 2 May 2012, he made his senior debut in a 2012 AFC Champions League group stage match which Beijing lost to Ulsan Hyundai 3–2 at Workers Stadium.
In July 2013, Xu was loaned to China League Two side Shenyang Dongjin until the end of 2013 season.

In March 2015, Xu transferred to China League One side Beijing BIT.
On 14 March 2015, Xu transferred to China League Two side Chengdu Qbao.

Career statistics
Statistics accurate as of match played 31 December 2020.

References

External links

1991 births
Living people
Chinese footballers
Footballers from Zhejiang
People from Taizhou, Zhejiang
Beijing Guoan F.C. players
Shenyang Dongjin players
Chengdu Better City F.C. players
Shaanxi Chang'an Athletic F.C. players
Chinese Super League players
China League One players
China League Two players
Association football midfielders
21st-century Chinese people